JJN may refer to:

JJN, the IATA code for Quanzhou Jinjiang International Airport, Fujian, China
JJN, the Indian Railways station code for Jhunjhunu railway station, Rajasthan, India
Jared James Nichols (born 1989), American blues-rock guitarist and singer